Veatrice Rice (October 1, 1949 – January 21, 2009) was a nurse turned security guard and television personality, best known for her appearances on Jimmy Kimmel Live!, where she served as a sidekick for comedian Jimmy Kimmel. Born in Atlanta, Georgia, and raised in Bowling Green, Kentucky, Rice worked as a parking lot security guard in the building where Jimmy Kimmel Live! is taped.  With the two other security guards on staff at the program, she performed in a variety of skits and the recurring segment "Worst Team on Television". Veatrice was characterized by her wry, sarcastic demeanor, with quiet moments punctuated by outbursts of obscene language.

Rice died of cancer on January 21, 2009. A montage of some of her funniest moments was played in her honor on Jimmy Kimmel Live! the following day.

References

1949 births
2009 deaths
20th-century American comedians
African-American nurses
African-American television personalities
African-American female comedians
American women comedians
American women nurses
American women television personalities
Comedians from Georgia (U.S. state)